The National Reform Association (NRA), formerly known as the National Association to Secure the Religious Amendment of the United States Constitution, is an organization that seeks to introduce a Christian amendment to the U.S. Constitution in order to make the United States a Christian state. Founded in 1864, the National Reform Association included representatives from eleven Christian denominations as well as the official support of a number of Churches. It publishes a magazine called The Christian Statesman.

History 
The National Reform Association was founded in 1864 by representatives from eleven Christian Churches in the United States. It sought to, and continues to advocate for the following Christian amendment to be introduced to the U.S. Constitution:

This movement soon gained the support of several Churches. For example, the Wesleyan Methodist Church, in its 1896 Disciple contained a section on National Reform, which continues to be retained by its successor, the Allegheny Wesleyan Methodist Connection in its most recent 2014 Discipline that contains the following statement:

As such, the Allegheny Wesleyan Methodist Church advocates for Bible reading in public schools, chaplaincies in the Armed Forces and in Congress, Sunday blue laws (reflecting historic Methodist belief in Sunday Sabbatarianism), and amendments that advance the recognition of God.

The National Reform Association desired for reverence for the Sunday Sabbath, opposing the distribution of newspapers on the Lord's Day as Sunday newspapers became popular in the 1880s.

In 1895, the Woman's Christian Temperance Union (WCTU), which was at that time the largest women's organization in the United States, proclaimed its solidarity with the National Reform Association "whose efforts are parallel to ours on many lines." To this end, the WCTU passed a resolution "God in Christ is the King of Nations, and as such should be acknowledged in our government; and His Word made the basis of our laws."

In the early 1900s, the National Reform Association supported the aims of the temperance movement, which was supported by many Christians at that time.

Notable people
 Sara Jane Crafts, editor-in-chief of the Christian Statesman, the official organ of the National Reform Association
 Ella M. George

See also

References

Further reading

External links 
National Reform Association (Official Website) 
National Reform Association (Archived Website) 

1864 establishments in the United States
Christian ecumenical organizations
Conservative organizations in the United States
Dominion theology
Political organizations based in the United States